Daniel Frank may refer to:
Daniel Frank (athlete) (1882–1965), American athlete
Daniel Frank (ice hockey) (born 1994), Italian ice hockey player

See also
Daniel Franco (disambiguation)
Daniel Franks (disambiguation)